Nickol Tal (ניקול טל; born 27 July 1994) is an Israeli fencer.

She won a bronze medal in women's epee at the 2014 Junior World Fencing Championships, and a bronze medal in women's epee at the 2019 Summer Universiade in Naples, Italy. Her club is Maccabi Maalot.

See also
 Israel at the 2019 Summer Universiade

References

External links
 FIE page

Universiade medalists in fencing
1994 births
Living people
Israeli female épée fencers
Universiade bronze medalists for Israel
Medalists at the 2019 Summer Universiade
21st-century Israeli women